Sebastian Shaw is the name of:

 Sebastian Shaw (actor) (1905–1994), English film and stage actor
 Sebastian Francis Shaw (born 1957), Roman Catholic metropolitan archbishop of Lahore
 Sebastian Shaw (comics), a character from the X-Men comic books by Marvel Comics
 Sebastian Shaw (serial killer) (1967–2021), Vietnamese-born American serial killer
 Sebastian Shaw, British TV actor on Coronation Street